Syed Badr-ul Hasan Khan Bahadur was an Indian actor and classical dancer who acted in silver screen and television. He was known as Pappu Polister.

Biography
Khan Bahadur was a descendant of Wajid Ali Shah. He acted in The Sword of Tipu Sultan in 1990 where he played the role of Maharaja of Mysore and won a National Award for Best Supporting Actor for acting in this television series. He was a part of Jodhaa Akbar where he played the role of Mulla Do-Piyaza.

Khan Bahadur was a classical dancer too. For his dancing he received an award from Birju Maharaj. He also received honorary doctorate degree in acting from Ambedkar University.

Khan Bahadur died on 5 February 2019.

Selected filmography

Television
 The Sword of Tipu Sultan
 Pratigya
 Jai Hanuman
 Chandrakanta
 Om Namah Shivay
 Safar
1857 Kranti

Film
 Ek Nambar Kaa Chor (1990)
Farishtay (1991)
Yalgaar (1992) 
 Khooni Dracula (1992)
 Phool Aur Angaar (1993)
 Andha Intaquam (1993)
 Teri Payal Mere Geet (1993)
 Betaaj Badshah (1994)
 Khuddar (1994)
 Hum Hain Khalnayak (1996)
 Tere Mere Sapne (1996)
 Daravani Haveli (1997)
 Jeb Katari (1997)
 Darmiyaan (1997)
 Bhayanak (1998)
 Maharaja (1998)
 Hero Hindustani (1998)
 Hindustan Ki Kasam (1999)
 Mann (1999)
 Phir Bhi Dil Hai Hindustani (2000)
 Badal (2000)
 Ittefaq (2001)
 Dil Dhoondhta Hai (2002)
 Yeh Mohabbat Hai (2002)
 Kranti (2002)
 Aap Mujhe Achche Lagne Lage (2002)
 Hamra Se Biyah Karba (2003)
 Dhund: The Fog (2004)
 Dil Ne Jise Apna Kahaa (2004)
 Bipasha: The Black Beauty (2006)
 Khoya Khoya Chand (2007)
 Jodhaa Akbar (2008)
 Indian Never Again Nirbhaya (2018)

References

External links
 

Male actors in Hindi cinema
Indian male film actors
Male actors in Hindi television
Indian male television actors
Indian male dancers
2019 deaths
Male actors from Lucknow
Year of birth missing